Torus Games is an Australian video game developer founded in 1994 by Bill McIntosh. The company is located in Bayswater, Victoria. Its managing director is Bill McIntosh. The company being a family business.

History 
They'd begin developing their first game in 1994, a Game Boy and Game Gear game based on the film Stargate, published by Acclaim Entertainment. Torus has released over 120 titles.

Torus has a single, scalable cross-platform game engine. The Torus game engine runs on consoles, handhelds (including those without floating point support) and mobile phones, and their unified asset pipeline allows Torus to deliver the same game from the same common code-base across all hardware platforms. Torus Games also use the Unreal and Unity engines, depending on the type of project they are developing.

They're most known for family action/adventure games, based on well-known licenses. Some of Torus Games' most recent releases include Beast Quest on PlayStation 4, Xbox One, Nintendo Switch and Steam. Torus are currently developing the HD Remake of Praetorians with Kalypso Media.

In 2015, Torus Games were awarded the Disney Developer of the Year Award for their efforts on Disney's Imagicademy initiative. They also launched their first original iOS and Android game, Crystal Crusade, followed by Flipper Fox and Heidi Price and the Orient Express in 2016.

In recent years, the company has partnered with Monash University to develop an educational tool assisting children with reduced attention spans. Project TALI has scope to become a screening tool, allowing for the possibility of earlier cognitive training for children with learning difficulties.

List of games 

PlayStation 4
 Hotel Transylvania 3: Monsters Overboard (Outright Games) (2018)
 PAW Patrol: On a Roll (Outright Games) (2018)
 Beast Quest (Maximum Games) (2018)
 Ben 10 (Outright Games) (2017)

Xbox One
 Hotel Transylvania 3: Monsters Overboard (Outright Games) (2018)
 Paw Patrol: On a Roll (Outright Games) (2018)
 Beast Quest (Maximum Games) (2018)
 Ben 10 (Outright Games) (2017)

Nintendo Switch
 Cartoon Network: Battle Crashers (GameMill Entertainment/Maximum Games) (2017)
 Hotel Transylvania 3: Monsters Overboard (Outright Games) (2018)
 Paw Patrol: On a Roll (Outright Games) (2018)

PlayStation 3
 Barbie and her Sisters: Puppy Rescue (Little Orbit) (2015)
 Monster High: New Ghoul in School (Little Orbit) (2015)
 How to Train Your Dragon 2 (Little Orbit) (2014)
 Falling Skies (Little Orbit) (2014)
 Rise of the Guardians: The Video Game (D3 Publisher of America) (2012)

Xbox 360
 Barbie and her Sisters: Puppy Rescue (Little Orbit) (2015)
 Monster High: New Ghoul in School (Little Orbit) (2015)
 How to Train Your Dragon 2 (Little Orbit) (2014)
 Falling Skies (Little Orbit) (2014)
 Rise of the Guardians: The Video Game (D3 Publisher of America) (2012)
 Monster Jam (Activision) (2007)

Wii U
 Barbie and her Sisters: Puppy Rescue (Little Orbit) (2015)
 Monster High: New Ghoul in School (Little Orbit) (2015)
 Penguins of Madagascar (Little Orbit) (2014)
 How to Train Your Dragon 2 (Little Orbit) (2014)
 Falling Skies (Little Orbit) (2014)
 How to Train Your Dragon 2 (Little Orbit) (2014)
 Barbie: Dreamhouse Party (Little Orbit) (2013)
 The Croods: Prehistoric Party (D3 Publisher of America) (2013)
 Rise of the Guardians: The Video Game (D3 Publisher of America) (2012)

Wii
 Barbie and her Sisters: Puppy Rescue (Little Orbit) (2015)
 Monster High: New Ghoul in School (Little Orbit) (2015)
 Penguins of Madagascar (Little Orbit) (2014)
 How to Train Your Dragon 2 (Little Orbit) (2014)
 Barbie: Dreamhouse Party (Little Orbit) (2013)
 Combo Pack: The Croods: Prehistoric Party and Rise of the Guardians (D3 Publisher of America) (2013)
 Turbo: Super Stunt Squad (D3 Publisher of America) (2013)
 The Croods: Prehistoric Party (D3 Publisher of America) (2013)
 Rise of the Guardians: The Video Game (D3 Publisher of America) (2012)
 Bigfoot: King of Crush (Zoo Entertainment) (2011)
 Stunt Flyer: Hero of the Skies (Just A Game GmbH) (2011) (Region 2 only)
 Scooby-Doo! and the Spooky Swamp (Warner Bros. Interactive) (2010)
 Kid Adventures: Sky Captain (D3 Publisher of America) (2010)
 Scooby-Doo! First Frights (Warner Bros. Interactive) (2009)
 Monster Jam: Urban Assault (Activision) (2008)
 Zoo Hospital (Majesco Entertainment) (2008)
 Monster Jam (Activision) (2007)
 Indianapolis 500 Legends (Destineer) (2007)

Nintendo 3DS
 Fireman Sam: to the Rescue (Avanquest) (2015) (Region 2 only)
 Thomas & Friends: Steaming Around Sodor (Avanquest) (2015) (Region 2 only)
 Mike the Knight and the Great Gallop (Avanquest) (2015) (Region 2 only)
 Barbie and her Sisters: Puppy Rescue (Little Orbit) (2015)
 Monster High: New Ghoul in School (Little Orbit) (2015)
 Penguins of Madagascar (Little Orbit) (2014)
 How to Train Your Dragon 2 (Little Orbit) (2014)
 Barbie: Dreamhouse Party (Little Orbit) (2013)
 Combo Pack: The Croods: Prehistoric Party and Madagascar 3 (D3 Publisher of America) (2013)
 Turbo: Super Stunt Squad (D3 Publisher of America) (2013)
 The Croods: Prehistoric Party (D3 Publisher of America) (2013)
 Rise of the Guardians: The Video Game (D3 Publisher of America) (2012)
 Madagascar 3: The Video Game (D3 Publisher of America) (2012)

Nintendo DS
 Monster High: 13 Wishes (Little Orbit) (2013)
 Barbie: Dreamhouse Party (Little Orbit) (2013)
 Combo Pack: The Croods: Prehistoric Party and Madagascar 3 (D3 Publisher of America) (2013)
 Turbo: Super Stunt Squad (D3 Publisher of America) (2013)
 The Croods: Prehistoric Party (D3 Publisher of America) (2013)
 Rise of the Guardians: The Video Game (D3 Publisher of America) (2012)
 Madagascar 3: The Video Game (D3 Publisher of America) (2012)
 Scooby-Doo! and the Spooky Swamp (Warner Bros. Interactive) (2010)
 Scooby-Doo! First Frights (Warner Bros. Interactive) (2009)
 Crystal Mines (Home Entertainment Suppliers) (2009) (Region 4 only)
 Backyard Football 2009 (Atari) (2008)
 Monster Jam: Urban Assault (Activision) (2008)
 Zoo Hospital (Majesco Entertainment) (2008)
 Backyard Football 2008 (Atari) (2007)
 Monster Jam (game) (Activision) (2007)
 Indianapolis 500 Legends (Destineer) (2007)
 Spider-Man: Battle for New York (Activision) (2006)
 Shrek Smash n' Crash Racing (Activision) (2006)

iOS
 Flipper Fox (Celago) (2016)
 Heidi Price and the Orient Express (Celago) (2016), (Calypso Entertainment) (2017)
 Crystal Crusade (Celago) (2015)
 Mickey's Shapes Sing-Along (Disney) (2015)
 Mickey's Magical Math World (Disney) (2015)
 Falling Skies Planetary Warfare (Little Orbit) (2014)
 Save Your Legs (RKPix) (2012)

Android Operating System
 Flipper Fox (Celago) (2016)
 Heidi Price and the Orient Express (Celago) (2016)
 Crystal Crusade (Celago) (2015)
 Mickey's Super Rocket Shapes (Disney) (2015)
 Falling Skies Planetary Warfare (Little Orbit) (2014)

PC
 Hotel Transylvania 3: Monsters Overboard (Outright Games) (2018)
 Paw Patrol: On a Roll (Outright Games) (2018)
 Ben 10 (Outright Games) (2017)
 Barbie and her Sisters: Puppy Rescue (Little Orbit) (2015)
 Monster High: New Ghoul in School (Little Orbit) (2015)
 Falling Skies (Little Orbit) (2014)
 Barbie: Dreamhouse Party (Little Orbit) (2013)
 Scooby-Doo! and the Spooky Swamp (Warner Bros. Interactive) (2012)
 Scooby-Doo! First Frights (Warner Bros. Interactive) (2011)
 Monster Jam (Activision) (2007)
 Squatter: The Classic Australian Game (HES) (1999)
 Carmageddon TDR 2000 (SCi) (2000)
 Dick Johnson V8 Challenge (HES) (1999)

PlayStation 2
 Scooby-Doo! and the Spooky Swamp (Warner Bros. Interactive) (2010)
 Scooby-Doo! First Frights (Warner Bros. Interactive) (2009)
 Monster Jam: Urban Assault (Activision) (2008)
 Monster Jam (Activision) (2007)
 Indianapolis 500 Legends (Destineer) (2008)
 Shrek Smash n' Crash Racing (Activision) (2006)
 Classified: The Sentinel Crisis (Global Star) (2005)
 Grand Prix Challenge (Atari) (2002) - Supplied art for tracks of Silverstone (UK), Magny-Cours (France) and Montreal (Canada)

PlayStation Portable
 Monster Jam: Urban Assault (Activision) (2008)
 Shrek Smash n' Crash Racing (Activision) (2006)

Xbox
 Classified: The Sentinel Crisis (Global Star) (2005)
 Grand Prix Challenge (Atari) (2002) - Supplied art for tracks of Silverstone (UK), Magny-Cours (France) and Montreal (Canada)

Nintendo GameCube
 Shrek Smash n' Crash Racing (Activision) (2006)

Game Boy Advance
 Backyard Sports Football 2007 (Atari) (2006)
 Spider-Man: Battle for New York (Activision) (2006)
 Shrek Smash n' Crash Racing (Activision) (2006)
 Curious George (Namco) (2006)
 Fantastic Four (Activision) (2005)
 Backyard Football 2006 (Atari) (2005)
 Sportsmans Pack 2 in 1 (Activision) (2005)
 Gumby vs the Astrobots (Namco) (2005)
 Fantastic 4 (Activision) (2005)
 Dead to Rights (Namco) (2004)
 Cabela's Big Game Hunter 2005 Adventures (Activision) (2004)
 Rapala Pro Fishing (Activision) (2004)
 Ice Nine (Bam! Entertainment) (2003)
 Pitfall: The Lost Expedition (Activision) (2003)
 Backyard Football (Atari) (2003)
 Space Invaders (Activision) (2002)
 The Invincible Iron Man (Activision) (2002)
 Duke Nukem Advance (Activision) (2002)
 Doom II (Activision) (2002)
 Minority Report: Everybody Runs (Activision) (2002)
 Jackie Chan Adventures: Legend of the Dark Hand (Activision) (2001)
 Planet of the Apes (Ubisoft) (2001)

Game Boy Color
 Planet of the Apes (Ubisoft) (2001)
 Spider-Man 2: The Sinister Six (Activision) (2001)
 Carmageddon TDR 2000 (SCi) (2000, cancelled)
 Max Steel: Covert Missions (Mattel Interactive) (2000, cancelled)
 Lion King: Simba's Mighty Adventure (Activision) (2000)
 NBA Hoopz (Midway) (2000)
 NBA Showtime: NBA on NBC (Midway) (2000)
 Star Wars: Yoda Stories (THQ) (1999)
 Duke Nukem (GT Interactive) (1999)
 Hello Kitty's Cube Frenzy (NewKidCo) (1999)
 NBA Jam 99 (Acclaim Entertainment) (1999)

Game Boy
 Beavis and Butt-Head (GT Interactive) (1999)
 NBA Jam Tournament Edition (Acclaim Entertainment) (1998)
 DragonHeart: Fire & Steel (Acclaim Entertainment) (1996)
 College Slam (Acclaim Entertainment) (1995)
 Stargate (Acclaim Entertainment) (1994)
 The Lost World: Jurassic Park (THQ) (1997)

Game Gear
 Stargate (Acclaim Entertainment) (1995)

N-Gage
 Ashen (Nokia) (2004)
 Operation Shadow (Nokia (2004)'

LeapFrog Series

Didj
 Didj Racing: Tiki Tropics (2008)

Leapster 2
 Go, Diego, Go! Animal Rescuer (2008) {port}
 CARS Supercharged (2008) {port}
 Sonic X (2008) {port}
 Cars (2008) {port}

L-Max
 Go, Diego, Go! Animal Rescuer (2007)
 Cars Supercharged (2007)
 NASCAR (2006)
 Sonic X (2005)
 Counting on Zero (2005)
 Cars (2006)

References

External links 
 Official website

Video game companies of Australia
Video game companies established in 1994
Australian companies established in 1994
Video game development companies
Companies based in Melbourne
Video game publishers